The Echo Maker is a 2006 novel by American writer Richard Powers. It won the National Book Award for Fiction 
and was a Pulitzer Prize for Fiction finalist.

Plot introduction
On a winter night on a remote Nebraska road, twenty-seven-year-old Mark Schluter flips his truck in a near-fatal accident. His older sister, Karin, his only near kin, returns reluctantly to their hometown to nurse Mark back from a traumatic head injury. But when he emerges from a protracted coma, Mark believes that this woman — who looks, acts, and sounds just like his sister — is really an impostor. Shattered by her brother's refusal to recognize her, Karin contacts the cognitive neurologist Gerald Weber, famous for his case histories describing brain disorders. Weber recognized Mark's condition as a rare case of Capgras syndrome — the delusion that people in one's life are doubles or impostors — and eagerly investigates.

What he discovers in Mark slowly undermines even his own sense of being. Meanwhile, Mark, armed only with a note left by an anonymous witness, attempts to learn what happened the night of his inexplicable accident.

Characters

Main characters
 Karin Schluter quits her job as a service representative to return home to Kearney, Nebraska to care for her comatose brother.
 Mark Schluter has a mysterious truck rollover on a deserted country road and eventually comes out of a coma suffering from a variety of delusions.
 Gerald Weber is a popular writer of books on neurology who answers a personal email from Karin requesting that he come to Nebraska. Weber may be a partial fictionalization of Oliver Sacks, 1933–2015, who was a neurologist, best-selling author, and professor of neurology at NYU School of Medicine. Sacks was the author of a number of nonfiction books, beginning with Awakenings (1973) and The Man Who Mistook His Wife for a Hat (1985), which use case histories interwoven with explanatory narrative to describe a range of brain conditions that result in unusual manifestations of neurologic deficits, in much the way Weber does in The Echo Maker.

Analysis
According to Richard Powers, 

In a review in the New York Review of Books, Margaret Atwood described the novel's "underlying sketch" as being from The Wonderful Wizard of Oz. 

Colson Whitehead, writing in The New York Times, called it a "post-911 novel .. not an elegy for How We Used to Live or a salute to Coming to Grips, but a quiet exploration of how we survive, day to day."

See also
 Sandhill crane

References

External links
"Fresh Air," December 12, 2006, radio interview with Richard Powers
Bibliography of editions of 'The Echo Maker.'
The Echo Maker reviews. Collected list of reviews.
The Echo Maker Reviews at Metacritic
Richard Powers talks with Alec Michod in The Believer

2006 American novels
2006 speculative fiction novels
Farrar, Straus and Giroux books
National Book Award for Fiction winning works
Novels by Richard Powers
Novels set in Nebraska